Isoceras teheranica is a moth in the family Cossidae. It was described by Franz Daniel in 1971. It is found in Iran.

References

Cossinae
Moths described in 1971
Moths of Asia